Byron Johnson may refer to:

 Ban Johnson (Byron Bancroft Johnson, 1864–1931), American baseball executive, founder of the American League
 Boss Johnson (Byron Ingemar Johnson, 1890–1964), Premier of British Columbia, Canada
 Byron Johnson (baseball) (1911–2005), American baseball player in the Negro leagues
 Byron L. Johnson (1917–2000), U.S. Representative from Colorado
 Byron F. Johnson (1894–1980), United States Marine Corps general